FM 99.00 Dub Manifest is a studio album from Basque artist Fermin Muguruza. It was released in 2000 and produced by Esan Ozenki.

Muguruza doesn't belong to any musical genre in particular but some punk, ska, jazz, jungle and funk influences can be found. Most songs contain political themes, with some promoting internationalism and social justice. Gizon Armatuak is about death squads in Central American countries, Big Benat denounces globalisation and uniformisation, while in Mendebaldarketa Muguruza laments on the situation of immigrants. In Diru Espainol Zikina he ridicules the appearance of murderous historical figures such as Hernán Cortés, Pizarro and Christopher Columbus on paper money, arguing it represents the arrogance and imperialism of the Spanish government.

Track listing
"FM 99.00 Dub Manifest"
"Ekhi Eder" (Beautiful Sun)
"Bere-Bar" (Berber-Bar) - with Zebda
"Itaka Berriro" (Itaca, again)
"Gizon Armatuak" (Men With Guns)
"Big Benat" 
"Mendebaldarketa" (Westernisation)
"Diru Espainol Zikina" (Dirty Spanish Money)
"Radical Chic"
"Irudikeriak" (Delusions)

2000 albums
Fermin Muguruza albums